Alick is both a masculine given name and a surname. Notable people with the name include:

Given name
Alick Aluwihare (1926–2009), Sri Lankan politician
Alick Athanaze, Dominican cricketer
Alick Bannerman (1854–1924), Australian cricketer
Alick Bevan (1915–1945), British cyclist
Alick Black (1909–1988), Australian rules footballer
Alick Bryant (1903–1985), Australian soldier
Alick Buchanan-Smith, Baron Balerno (1898–1984), British soldier and politician
Alick Buchanan-Smith (politician) (1932–1991), British politician
Alick Davison (1886–1945), Australian rules footballer
Alick Downer (1910–1981), Australian politician and diplomat
Alick Foord-Kelcey (1913–1973), British Royal Air Force officer
Alick Glennie (1925–2003), British computer scientist
Alick Grant (1916–2008), English footballer
Alick Handford (1869–1935), English cricketer
Alick Horsnell (1881–1916), English architect
Alick Isaacs (1921–1967), Scottish virologist
Alick Jeffrey (1939–2000), English footballer
Alick Kay (1884–1961), Australian politician
Alick Lill (1904–1987), Australian rules footballer
Alick Macheso (born 1968), Zimbabwean musician
Alick Mackenzie (1870–1947), Australian cricketer
Alick Maclean (1872–1936), English composer and conductor
Alick Maemae (born 1985), Solomon Islands footballer
Alick McCallum (1877–1937), Australian politician
Alick J. Murray (c. 1850 – 1929), Australian pastoralist
Alick Nkhata (1922–1978), Zambian musician
Alick Ogilvie (1887–1915), Australian rules footballer
Alick Osborne, Australian politician
Alick Lindsay Poole (1908–2008), New Zealand botanist and forester
Alick Robinson (1906–1977), English footballer
Alick Rowe (1939–2009), British writer
Alick Stevens (1898–1987), British Royal Air Force officer
Alick Tipoti (born 1975), Indigenous Australian (Torres Strait Islander) artist and activist
Alick Walker (1925–1999), British palaeontologist
Alick Wyers (1907–1980), English cricketer

Surname
Elijah Alick (born 1996), Australian rugby league player

Masculine given names